The Boy from Bullarah is a 1925 novel by Australian sporting novelist Arthur Wright.

"Finesse, fine writing, characterisation, have no place among the means Mr. Wright employs", said the West Australian.

Plot
Boxer Terry Truval wants to make it in the big city, Sydney. Dan Jay, filmmaker, tries to turn him into a film star.

References

External links
The Boy from Bullarah at AustLit
The Boy from Bullarah at National Archives of Australia
Newspaper articles on the novel at Trove

1925 Australian novels
Australian sports novels
Novels about boxing
Novels set in Sydney